Petrophile striata is a species of flowering plant in the family Proteaceae and is endemic to southwestern Western Australia. It is a shrub with pinnate or bipinnate, striated, sharply-pointed leaves, and oval heads of silky-hairy yellow, creamy-yellow or cream-coloured flowers.

Description

Taxonomy
Petrophile striata was first formally described in 1830 by Robert Brown in the Supplementum to his Prodromus Florae Novae Hollandiae et Insulae Van Diemen from material collected by Charles Fraser near the Swan River in 1826. The specific epithet (striata) refers to the leaves.

Distribution and habitat
Petrophile striata grows in woodland and shrubland in sandy-clay-gravel soils over laterite or granite and is found from Eneabba to Wagin as well as on the Darling Range and nearby coastal plain.

Conservation status
This petrophile is classified as "not threatened" by the Western Australian Government Department of Parks and Wildlife.

References

striata
Eudicots of Western Australia
Endemic flora of Western Australia
Plants described in 1830
Taxa named by Robert Brown (botanist, born 1773)